ARISE Detroit! is a coalition of community groups in Detroit, banding together in the hopes of making a bigger impact than they each can  accomplish separately. ARISE is an acronym for Activating Resources and Inspiring Service and Empowerment.

The coalition is a way to link together the hundreds of programs and agencies working to combat child and family issues – violence, parenting, illiteracy, education, drug abuse, community development, youth mentoring, etc. — to produce more resources, more volunteers and more help for the people who need it. ARISE will create a massive community wide movement, supported by people, non-profit groups, the media and individuals, to offer hope and let people know that they can play a personal role in improving their communities.

The project began with a $300,000 grant from the Skillman Foundation, one of its founding partners. The coalition grew out of brainstorming sessions the foundation began hosting after Bill Cosby's January 2005 town meeting where he challenged black Detroiters to stop blaming white people for problems they could solve themselves.

ARISE will ask its volunteers to find a place with an existing service agency that will make use of their talents. That could mean mentoring, tutoring, advising on health matters, combating illiteracy, teaching financial literacy, resolving conflicts, or supporting recreation centers. And ARISE also will help connect city residents who need help with the organizations that provide it.

Founding Partners

 ACCESS
 African-American Family Magazine
 Alternatives for Girls
 Anderson Memorial Church/Project Hope
 Art of Leadership
 Black Family Development
 Children's Aid Society
 City Year Detroit
 Communities in Schools
 DAPCEP
 Detroit Free Press
 Detroit Parent Network
 Detroit Youth Foundation
 Hope United Methodist Church
 Legacy Associates Foundation
 Marshall Alexander Youth Organization
 Metro Parent Publishing Group
 Neighborhood Services Organization/Youth Initiative Project
 ProLiteracy Detroit
 The Skillman Foundation
 Southwest Solutions
 Youth Sports and Recreation Commission

References

External links
 ARISE Detroit! website
 Detroit Free Press pre-launch article
 Skillman Foundation website

Charities based in Michigan
Social welfare charities based in the United States
Community organizations
Organizations based in Detroit